Eugene Ethelbert Miller, best known as E. Ethelbert Miller (born November 20, 1950), is an African-American poet, teacher and literary activist, based in Washington, DC. He is the author of several collections of poetry and two memoirs, the editor of Poet Lore magazine, and the host of the weekly WPFW morning radio show On the Margin.

Life and career
Miller was born in the Bronx, New York.
He received his B.A. from Howard University. He is the author of 13 books of poetry, two memoirs and is the editor of three poetry anthologies. His work has appeared in numerous publications, including Beltway Poetry Quarterly, Poet Lore, and Sojourners.

Miller was the founder and director of the Ascension Poetry Reading Series, one of the oldest literary series in the Washington area. He was director of Howard University's African-American Resource Center from 1974 for more than 40 years. Miller has taught at various schools, including American University, Emory & Henry College, George Mason University, Harpeth Hall School and the University of Nevada, Las Vegas. He was also a core faculty member of the writing seminars at Bennington College. He worked with Operation Homecoming for the National Endowment for the Humanities (NEH).

He currently serves as board chairperson of the Institute for Policy Studies. He is also on the boards of Split This Rock and the Writer's Center, and since 2002 has been co-editor of Poet Lore magazine, the oldest poetry journal in the US.  He is former chair of the Humanities Council of Washington, D.C., and has served on the boards of the AWP, the Edmund Burke School, PEN American Center, PEN/Faulkner Foundation, and the Washington Area Lawyer for the Arts (WALA). He hosts a weekly morning radio show on WPFW called On the Margin.

In 1979, Marion Barry, the Mayor of Washington, D.C., where Miller lives, proclaimed September 28, 1979, as "E. Ethelbert Miller Day." Subsequently, on May 21, 2001, an "E. Ethelbert Miller Day" was also proclaimed by the Mayor of Jackson, Tennessee.

Miller's papers are held at Emory & Henry College and The George Washington University.

Awards and honors

1979: September 28 proclaimed as "E. Ethelbert Miller Day" by the Mayor of Washington, D.C.
1982: Mayor's Art Award for Literature
1988: Received the Public Humanities Award from the D.C. Humanities Council
1993: Columbia Merit Award
1994: Made an Honorary Citizen of the city of Baltimore on July 17 by the Mayor of Baltimore
1994: PEN Oakland Josephine Miles Award (for In Search of Color Everywhere)
1995: O. B. Hardison, Jr. Poetry Prize
1996: Honorary doctorate of literature awarded on May 18 by Emory & Henry College
1997: Stephen Henderson Poetry Award from the African American Literature and Culture Society
2001: May 21 declared as "E. Ethelbert Miller Day" by the Mayor of Jackson, Tennessee
2003: Fathering Words selected by DC WE READ for the one book, one city program sponsored by the D.C. Public Libraries
2003: Honored by First Lady Laura Bush at the White House
2004: Fulbright Scholarship recipient
2015: Inducted into the Washington, DC Hall of Fame
2016: AWP George Garrett Award for Outstanding Community Service in Literature and the DC Mayor's Arts Award for Distinguished Honor
2018: Inducted into Gamma Xi Phi, a fraternity for artists

Bibliography

Poetry
"The Land of Smiles and the Land of No Smiles: A Poem." 1974.

The Fire This Time: 1992 and Beyond Los Angeles (Heaven Chapbook series), White Fields Press, 1993.

 
 

 The Collected Poems of E. Ethelbert Miller (ed. Kirsten Porter), Willow Books, 2016. 
 If God Invented Baseball: Poems, Simon and Schuster, 2018. 
 When Your Wife Has Tommy John Surgery and Other Baseball Stories, Simon and Schuster, 2021.

Anthologies

Jonathan Andersen, ed. (2008). Seeds of Fire: Contemporary Poetry from the Other U. S. A. Smokestack Books.

Memoirs

References

External links
"Living the Legacy"  – official website
American Academy of Poets page
Two Poems by Miller at Beltway Poetry Quarterly
Audio interview with Grace Cavalieri
"E. Ethelbert Miller", reverbiage, NPR
"Poetry by E. Ethelbert Miller" , On Being
"E. Ethelbert Miller, Featured Writer", Writing For Peace, February 2020.
"Talking With Poets: E. Ethelbert Miller, The Poet of Baseball and of Life". Interview with Indran Amirthanayagam. The Poetry Channel, July 12, 2021.

1950 births
Living people
20th-century African-American writers
20th-century American male writers
20th-century American poets
21st-century African-American writers
21st-century American male writers
21st-century American poets
African-American male writers
African-American poets
American male poets
American University faculty and staff
Bennington College faculty
Emory and Henry College faculty
George Mason University faculty
Howard University alumni
PEN Oakland/Josephine Miles Literary Award winners
Poets from New York (state)
University of Nevada, Las Vegas faculty
Writers from the Bronx